Iris lazica, the Lazistan iris, is a species of flowering plant in the family Iridaceae, native to the Black Sea coast of Turkey and Georgia, and also cultivated as an ornamental plant in temperate regions. The flower colour is typically pale lilac. Exceptionally for an iris in its group, this species prefers moist conditions and will tolerate some shade.

Iris lazica has gained the Royal Horticultural Society's Award of Garden Merit.

References

lazica
Plants described in 1895